California pottery includes industrial, commercial, and decorative pottery produced in the Northern California and Southern California regions of the U.S. state of California.  Production includes brick, sewer pipe, architectural terra cotta, tile, garden ware, tableware, kitchenware, art ware, figurines, giftware, and ceramics for industrial use.  Ceramics include terra cotta, earthenware, porcelain, and stoneware products.

Key milestones in the history of California pottery include: the arrival of Spanish settlers, the advent of Statehood and subsequent population growth, the arts and crafts movement, Great Depression, World War II era and the post-WWII onslaught of low-priced imports leading to a steep decline in the number of California potteries. California potters large and small have left a legacy of tableware design, collectibles, art, and architecture.

History 
Tile has been a favorite building material in California since the early Spanish settled the area and brought with them the tradition of using brightly-colored tiles in architecture. Helen Stiles, author of numerous books on the history of pottery, noted that Spanish, Mexican, and  Chinese design of the 17th and 18th centuries all influenced the decoration of tile and other pottery in California.

As people moved into California after statehood in 1848, the demand for ceramic products grew exponentially. Buildings needed roofs, floors, and sewer pipes.  The ceramic industry grew as the demand increased.  The "Golden Era in tile making" and art pottery, influenced by the Arts and Crafts movement, was around 1910. Architect Julia Morgan used tiles to adorn her buildings including the Hearst Castle in the 1920s.

The most active period for the production of household ceramics including tableware, kitchenware, giftware, and art ware was from the 1930s through the 1960s.  The major area of U.S. household ceramics production was in the Los Angeles basin. Around Los Angeles there were over 300 producers of figurines. Next in size was the Trenton area, followed by East Liverpool, and a few in the middle west such as Ceramic Arts Studio, Red Wing Pottery  and Haeger Potteries.

The period around World War II saw the greatest growth for the U.S. ceramic industry. With imports cut off from European and Asian markets, small family-owned and larger potteries stepped in to fill the need for ceramic giftware and tableware throughout the United States. By 1948, "the peak year for the industry, over eight hundred ceramic concerns were in operation throughout California."
With sunlight year round, an abundance of raw materials, and relatively inexpensive natural gas, California became competitive with centers of ceramic production such as the "Pottery Capital of the World" East Liverpool, Ohio and Stoke-on-Trent, Staffordshire, England.

In the 1950s, favorable trade agreements toward Asian countries contributed to a flood of competitively priced ceramic wares entering the United States market. Only a fraction of California potteries survived this competition through the early 1960s.  Today, only a few are still in business.

"Big Five" California potteries 
The "Big Five" California potteries, from the 1930s to the 1960s in reference to the range of products and output, were Vernon Kilns, J.A. Bauer Pottery, Metlox Potteries, Pacific Clay Products, and Gladding, McBean & Co.  All of the "Big Five" potteries operated production facilities in the Los Angeles Basin.  Gladding, McBean & Co. grew from one factory manufacturing sewer pipe and architectural terra cotta in Lincoln, California to factories throughout California and the Pacific Northwest.  Vernon Kilns closed in 1958, J.A. Bauer in 1962, and Metlox in 1988. The former Gladding, McBean & Co.'s Franciscan tableware and tile factory in Los Angeles was bought by Wedgwood from the Interpace corporation in 1979.  Wedgwood closed the Franciscan Ceramics plant in 1984, moving production of the Franciscan tableware brands to England.  The former Gladding, McBean & Co.'s Lincoln factory was purchased by Pacific Coast Building Products in 1976 and continues to produce sewer pipe, architectural terra cotta, and terra cotta garden ware. Pacific Clay Products discontinued manufacturing tableware, art ware, and figurines in 1942.  Pacific Clay Products continues to manufacture sewer pipe.

Big Five potteries table
To use the sortable tables: click on the icons at the top of each column to sort that column in alphabetical order; click again for reverse alphabetical order.

Potteries of California

Northern California 

Geographically, see Northern California.

To use the sortable tables: click on the icons at the top of each column to sort that column in alphabetical order; click again for reverse alphabetical order.

Southern California 

Geographically, see Southern California.

To use the sortable tables: click on the icons at the top of each column to sort that column in alphabetical order; click again for reverse alphabetical order.

Studio pottery

Gallery

Tile

Art ware and giftware

Figurines

Tableware

Footnotes

Further reading 

Derwich, Jenny B. and Mary Latos. Dictionary Guide to United States Pottery and Porcelain: Ninth and Twentieth Century. Jenstan, Franklin, Michigan (1984) 
Chipman, Jack. Collector's Encyclopedia of California Pottery. Collector Books, Paducah, Kentucky (1999) 
Chipman, Jack. California Pottery Scrapbook. Collector Books, Paducah, Kentucky (2004) 
Lehner, Lois. Lehner's Encyclopedia Of US Marks On Pottery, Porcelain Clay. Collectors Books, Paducah, Kentucky (1988) 
Schneider, Mike. California Potteries, The Complete Book. Schiffer Publishing, Atglen, Pennsylvania (1995) 
Stern, Bill. California Pottery: From Missions to Modernism. Chronicle Books (2001) 
The California Heritage Museum, Joseph A. Taylor ed. California Tile: The Golden Era 1910-1940: Acme to Handcraft.  Schiffer Publishing LTD, Atglen, Pennsylvania (2003) 
The California Heritage Museum, Joseph A. Taylor ed. California Tile: The Golden Era 1910-1940: Hispano-Moresque to Woolenius.  Schiffer Publishing LTD, Atglen, Pennsylvania (2003) 

American pottery
Art in California
American art pottery
Ceramic art
Ceramics manufacturers of the United States
Companies based in California